Tarar is a Jat surname found among Hindus, Sikhs and Muslims in India and Pakistan, mainly in the Punjab region. 

Notable people with the name include:
 
 Mamoon Jaffar Tarar, Pakistani politician
 Bilal Farooq Tarar, Pakistani politician
 Muhammad Rafiq Tarar (born 1929), Pakistani politician who has served as President of Pakistan
 Mumtaz Ahmed Tarar, Pakistani politician
 Mustansar Hussain Tarar (born 1939), Pakistani author
 Saira Afzal Tarar, Pakistani politician
 Amir Sultan Tarar, Army officer

References

 surnames
Jat clans of Punjab
Jat clans of Pakistan
Jat clans of India
Indian surnames
Hindu surnames
Punjabi-language surnames
Punjabi tribes